Live From Planet Earth may refer to:

 Ben Elton Live from Planet Earth, an Australian television series
 Live From Planet Earth (album), a live album produced by UK post hardcore band, Enter Shikari